Bedale railway station is on the Wensleydale Railway and serves the town of Bedale in North Yorkshire, England.

History
First opened by the Bedale and Leyburn Railway in November 1855, the station very nearly did not get built at all as the initial plans for the Leeming to Leyburn route would have completely bypassed the town. This problem was subsequently corrected (following a major outcry in the locality) and by May 1856, passenger services had started running between Northallerton and Leyburn.  These were subsequently extended to Hawes and Hawes Junction (later Garsdale) by the North Eastern Railway in 1878.

Although the section between Bedale and Leeming was doubled by the turn of the century, the station never received a second platform as the line became single again before passing through it and the adjacent level crossing.  Services were always modest at best, with a basic timetable of between five and seven trains each way operating right up until the closure of the line to passengers in April 1954, less than a decade after British Railways took over the line upon nationalisation of the UK network.

The platform was given a moderate facelift in 1970 when the Royal Train was stabled overnight in the station. The Queen was on a ceremonial visit to the nearby Catterick military complex.

The station remained open for goods traffic for many years after the cessation of passenger trains (until 1982) and even then the platform and signal box survived (the latter to supervise the crossing and the last remaining passing loop on the otherwise single track route).  Limestone trains from Redmire to the steelworks at Redcar ended in December 1992, but the line was subsequently retained for use by the Ministry of Defence to move military hardware to and from Catterick Garrison via a new transshipment facility at Redmire.

Preservation

The Wensleydale Railway Company took over the station after leasing the branch from Railtrack in the spring of 2003, with services returning to Bedale in 2004 for the first time in 50 years. The WRC use the surviving station building and the adjacent brick-built signal box.

Trains currently operate  between Leeming and Redmire, but the company hopes to eventually rebuild the currently derelict section of the line west of Redmire and run services all the way from Northallerton to Garsdale. The Class 31 D5584 diesel locomotive shown in the heading image was operating a Sunday evening special.

The signal box
The signal box and the station are actually in Aiskew by Parish boundary definitions (the traditional parish boundary was Bedale Beck). However, the signal box was given Grade II Listed Status in February 1993 and as such, it is now in the Bedale Conservation area. The box is believed to have been designed by G T Andrews.

References

Heritage railway stations in North Yorkshire
Wensleydale
Railway stations in Great Britain opened in 1855
Railway stations in Great Britain closed in 1954
Railway stations in Great Britain opened in 2004
Former North Eastern Railway (UK) stations